Bupyeong is an area surrounding Bupyeong District, Gyeyang District, Seo District, part of Bucheon and Guro District, Seoul. Until 1914, Bupyeong was a separate county independent to Incheon.

References

Bupyeong District
Gyeyang District
Seo District, Incheon
Guro District, Seoul
Bucheon